Below is a list of Pi Lambda Phi notable Alumni Brothers. Pi Lambda Phi is a fraternity  in the United States.

Brothers

Academia

Arts, entertainment and journalism

Film, television and radio

Journalism & Media

Literature

Music & Composers

Visual Arts

Business

Government, Law & Policy

Members of the U.S. Congress

Parliament of Canada

U.S. Cabinet and cabinet level positions

U.S. Governors

State & local legislators

State & local cabinet and cabinet level positions

Judges & attorneys

Diplomats

Military

Religion

Science & Medicine

Sports & athletics

Π – Big Pi Chapter and induction date

References

Pi Lambda Phi
Pi Lambda Phi